DWOK-FM may refer to:

 DWOK-FM (Olongapo City)
 DWOK-FM (Puerto Princesa City)